Cachoeiras (a plural form of the Portuguese meaning waterfall) may refer to several places:

Cachoeiras, Niteroi, a neighborhood of the municipality of Niterói in the state of Rio de Janeiro in Brazil
Cachoeiras, Portugal, a parish in the municipality of Vila Franca do Xira
Cachoeiras de Macacu municipality, Rio de Janeiro state, Brazil

See also

Cachoeira (disambiguation)